Epicoma melanosticta is a moth of the family Notodontidae first described by Edward Donovan in 1805. It is found in Australia, including Tasmania.

The wingspan is about 30 mm.

The larvae feed on Calothamnus validus, Calothamnus homalophyllus and Leptospermum species.

References

Thaumetopoeinae